Qali Baf (also Romanized as Qālī Bāf) is a village in Faravan Rural District, Kohanabad District, Aradan County, Semnan Province, Iran. At the 2006 census, its population was 39, in 17 families.

References 

Populated places in Aradan County